Allotropy or allotropism is the property of some chemical elements to exist in two or more different forms, in the same physical state, known as allotropes of the elements. Allotropes are different structural modifications of an element: the atoms of the element are bonded together in different manners.
For example, the allotropes of carbon include diamond (the carbon atoms are bonded together to form a cubic lattice of tetrahedra), graphite (the carbon atoms are bonded together in sheets of a hexagonal lattice), graphene (single sheets of graphite), and fullerenes (the carbon atoms are bonded together in spherical, tubular, or ellipsoidal formations).

The term allotropy is used for elements only, not for compounds. The more general term, used for any compound, is polymorphism, although its use is usually restricted to solid materials such as crystals. Allotropy refers only to different forms of an element within the same physical phase (the state of matter, such as a solid, liquid or gas). The differences between these states of matter would not alone constitute examples of allotropy. Allotropes of chemical elements are frequently referred to as polymorphs or as phases of the element.

For some elements, allotropes have different molecular formulae or different crystalline structures, as well as a difference in physical phase; for example, two allotropes of oxygen (dioxygen, O2, and ozone, O3) can both exist in the solid, liquid and gaseous states. Other elements do not maintain distinct allotropes in different physical phases; for example, phosphorus has numerous solid allotropes, which all revert to the same P4 form when melted to the liquid state.

History
The concept of allotropy was originally proposed in 1840 by the Swedish scientist Baron Jöns Jakob Berzelius (1779–1848). The term is derived . After the acceptance of Avogadro's hypothesis in 1860, it was understood that elements could exist as polyatomic molecules, and two allotropes of oxygen were recognized as O2 and O3. In the early 20th century, it was recognized that other cases such as carbon were due to differences in crystal structure.

By 1912, Ostwald noted that the allotropy of elements is just a special case of the phenomenon of polymorphism known for compounds, and proposed that the terms allotrope and allotropy be abandoned and replaced by polymorph and polymorphism. Although many other chemists have repeated this advice, IUPAC and most chemistry texts still favour the usage of allotrope and allotropy for elements only.

Differences in properties of an element's allotropes
Allotropes are different structural forms of the same element and can exhibit quite different physical properties and chemical behaviours. The change between allotropic forms is triggered by the same forces that affect other structures, i.e., pressure, light, and temperature. Therefore, the stability of the particular allotropes depends on particular conditions. For instance, iron  changes from a body-centered cubic structure (ferrite) to a face-centered cubic structure (austenite) above 906 °C, and tin undergoes a modification known as tin pest from a metallic form to a semiconductor form below 13.2 °C (55.8 °F). As an example of allotropes having different chemical behaviour, ozone (O3) is a much stronger oxidizing agent than dioxygen (O2).

List of allotropes
Typically, elements capable of variable coordination number and/or oxidation states tend to exhibit greater numbers of allotropic forms. Another contributing factor is the ability of an element to catenate.

Examples of allotropes include:

Non-metals

Metalloids

Metals

Among the metallic elements that occur in nature in significant quantities (56 up to U, without Tc and Pm), almost half (27) are allotropic at ambient pressure: Li, Be, Na, Ca, Ti, Mn, Fe, Co, Sr, Y, Zr, Sn, La, Ce, Pr, Nd, Sm, Gd, Tb, Dy, Yb, Hf, Tl, Th, Pa and U. Some phase transitions between allotropic forms of technologically relevant metals are those of Ti at 882 °C, Fe at 912 °C and 1394 °C, Co at 422 °C, Zr at 863 °C, Sn at 13 °C and U at 668 °C and 776 °C.

Lanthanides and actinides

 Cerium, samarium, dysprosium and ytterbium have three allotropes.
 Praseodymium, neodymium, gadolinium  and terbium have two allotropes.
 Plutonium has six distinct solid allotropes under "normal" pressures. Their densities vary within a ratio of some 4:3, which vastly complicates all kinds of work with the metal (particularly casting, machining, and storage). A seventh plutonium allotrope exists at very high pressures. The transuranium metals Np, Am, and Cm are also allotropic.
 Promethium, americium, berkelium and californium have three allotropes each.

Nanoallotropes 
In 2017, the concept of nanoallotropy was proposed by Prof. Rafal Klajn of the Organic Chemistry Department of the Weizmann Institute of Science. Nanoallotropes, or allotropes of nanomaterials, are nanoporous materials that have the same chemical composition (e.g., Au), but differ in their architecture at the nanoscale (that is, on a scale 10 to 100 times the dimensions of individual atoms). Such nanoallotropes may help create ultra-small electronic devices and find other industrial applications. The different nanoscale architectures translate into different properties, as was demonstrated for surface-enhanced Raman scattering performed on several different nanoallotropes of gold. A two-step method for generating nanoallotropes was also created.

See also
Isomer
Polymorphism (materials science)

Notes

References

External links

Allotropes – Chemistry Encyclopedia

 
Chemistry
Inorganic chemistry
Physical chemistry